Elizabeth Hill Boone (born September 6, 1948) is an American art historian, ethnohistorian and academic, specialising in the study of Latin American art  and in particular the early colonial and pre-Columbian art, iconography and pictorial codices associated with the Mixtec, Aztec and other Mesoamerican cultures in the central Mexican region. Her extensive published research covers investigations into the nature of Aztec writing, the symbolism and structure of Aztec art and iconography and the interpretation of Mixtec and Aztec codices.

Boone has been a professor of art history at Tulane University since 1994–95, holding the Martha and Donald Robertson Chair in Latin American Art. She is also a research associate at Tulane's Middle American Research Institute (MARI). From 2006 Boone took a sabbatical from lecturing and research at Tulane, to accept a position to pursue independent research as the Andrew W. Mellon Professor at the National Gallery of Art's Center for Advanced Study in the Visual Arts (CASVA), an appointment lasting through 2008. Boone had previously been a Paul Mellon Senior Fellow at CASVA, in 1993–94.

Academic career
Elizabeth Hill Boone commenced her undergraduate studies in fine arts at The College of William & Mary in Williamsburg, Virginia, obtaining a B.A. in 1970. She then studied art history at California State University, Northridge in 1971–72, and completed her postgraduate degrees at the University of Texas at Austin, obtaining an MA in 1974 and a PhD in pre-Columbian art history, which was awarded in 1977.

After receiving her PhD, Boone secured a research associate position at University of Texas at San Antonio's Research Center for the Arts, where she worked for three years. In 1980 Boone took up a position in pre-Columbian studies at the research institution she would be associated with for the next fifteen years, the Dumbarton Oaks Research Library and Collection located in Washington, D.C. Initially as associate curator (1980–83) and then as Director of Pre-Columbian Studies and Curator of the Pre-Columbian Collection (1983–95), Boone oversaw and held responsibility for Dumbarton Oaks' research and scholarship programs, symposia and colloquia, scheduled publications and the curatorship of the institution's libraries and collection of pre-Columbian artworks. From 2006 onwards Boone has retained a position as one of the six-member Board of Senior Fellows in pre-Columbian Studies at Dumbarton Oaks.

In 1995 Boone relocated to New Orleans, Louisiana to become professor of art history at Tulane University, where she teaches courses on Mesoamerican, Aztec and colonial-era art history, general art interpretation and theory, and continues to publish research papers and books in the field.

In 1990 Boone was awarded the Orden del Águila Azteca (Order of the Aztec Eagle), Mexico's highest decoration awarded to non-citizens.

During 2010 Boone served as president of the American Society for Ethnohistory.

Boone is corresponding fellow of the Academia Mexicana de la Historia.

Published works
Boone's publications include:
authored books—
 
 
 
 
contributed chapters—

Notes

References

External links
 Faculty page, at the Newcomb Art Dept, Tulane University
 

American Mesoamericanists
Women Mesoamericanists
Aztec scholars
Mixtec scholars
American art historians
Latin Americanists
Tulane University faculty
College of William & Mary alumni
University of Texas at Austin College of Liberal Arts alumni
1948 births
Living people
Historians of Mesoamerican art
20th-century Mesoamericanists
21st-century Mesoamericanists
Fellows of the American Academy of Arts and Sciences
American women historians
Women art historians
20th-century American women writers